"Intrepid" is a song recorded by American rock band Pinegrove. The song was released on November 1, 2017 through Run for Cover Records, as the lead single from the band's third studio album Skylight (2018). It was written by singer-songwriter Evan Stephens Hall; lyrically, the song examines love and distance in a global context.

"Intrepid" was widely acclaimed by contemporary music critics. It was their final single on Run for Cover, as the group exited the label the next year.

Background
"Intrepid" is a "careful" meditation on relationships; specifically, it has been interpreted as about the "struggles and personal growth that come with long distance relationships." A press release accompanying the song's debut included a statement from Hall:

Timothy Monger at AllMusic characterized the song as "moody and slow-building." It utilizes a soft-loud sonic dynamic; midway through the song, it shifts from a quieter sound to an explosive, shouting chorus. The recording of the song was documented in the band's web series, Command + S, chronicling the making of Skylight.

Reception
"Intrepid" was teased in live concerts prior to its official debut; they shared the song on social media platforms shortly after posting the last portion of their aforementioned Command + S series on November 1, 2017.

"Intrepid" was widely praised. Pitchfork 's Sasha Geffen designated it "Best New Track", calling it a "powerful dose of catharsis." Billboard Rob Arcand observed that "the track comes loaded with all the sort of ringing wordplay and unfettered enthusiasm that made their breakout Cardinal so memorable." Lars Gotrich at NPR extolled its "all-or-nothing performance, exploded just as far your eye can see the universe." Spin contributor Arielle Gordon considered it an advancement of their sound, commenting, "The winding, melodic guitar  the standard emo chord progressions in a back and forth that keeps the song feeling fresh until its subdued ending."

Personnel
Credits adapted from Marigold liner notes.
Pinegrove
 Evan Stephens Hall - guitar, vocals, percussion, production, mixing, cover art
 Zack Levine - drums, percussion, mixing

Additional personnel
Josh Marré — guitar, dobro, lap steel guitar, vocals
Nick Levine — guitar, pedal steel guitar
 Sam Skinner - guitar, engineer, mixing, production
 Nandi Rose Plunkett - vocals, keyboards, synthesizer
 Adan Carlo Feliciano – bass guitar
 Greg Calbi – mastering

References

2017 singles
2018 songs
Pinegrove (band) songs